Ernesto Hugo Aparicio (born 28 December 1948) is a former footballer from El Salvador who represented his country at the 1970 FIFA World Cup in Mexico.

Honours
Primera División de Fútbol de El Salvador: 1
 1970

References

1948 births
Living people
Salvadoran footballers
El Salvador international footballers
1970 FIFA World Cup players
C.D. Atlético Marte footballers

Association football forwards